Norbert Lipusz (born 23 April 1986 in Miskolc) is a Hungarian football player who currently plays for Ceglédi VSE.

External links
 Profile

1986 births
Living people
Sportspeople from Miskolc
Hungarian footballers
Association football midfielders
Diósgyőri VTK players
Dunaújváros FC players
Kazincbarcikai SC footballers
Kaposvári Rákóczi FC players
Mezőkövesdi SE footballers
Ceglédi VSE footballers
Nemzeti Bajnokság I players